In the 2014–15 season, Associazione Calcio Milan competed in Serie A for the 81st time, as well as the Coppa Italia. It was the club's 32nd consecutive season in the top flight of Italian football.

This was Milan's first season since 1998–99 in which the club did not participate in any European competitions, having failed to qualify after finishing eighth in the 2013–14 league season. Filippo Inzaghi was appointed as the new coach of the team.

Players

Squad information
.

Transfers

Summer 2014
Milan continued the trend from the previous season by signing free agents, including Michael Agazzi, Alex and Jérémy Ménez, that arrived in early summer. Major efforts, however, were made to confirm and/or fully acquire players already presents, but on loan or co-ownership (e.g. Andrea Poli, Riccardo Saponara, Michelangelo Albertazzi and Adil Rami), while only M'Baye Niang start the season after his return from previous loan. Pablo Armero, Fernando Torres and Marco van Ginkel also joined Milan on loan. In the last day of the transfer window, Milan bought Giacomo Bonaventura.

A few important players from the last season parted ways with Milan. Marco Amelia and Urby Emanuelson left after their contracts ended, Kaká activated the release clause in his contract, Adel Taarabt returned to Queens Park Rangers after his loan expired, while Kévin Constant, Mario Balotelli and Bryan Cristante were sold, allowing Milan to invest the incomed money in further acquisitions. The club also decided to sell Alberto Paloschi, Rodrigo Ely and Kingsley Boateng, instead of loaning them like in the past. Alessandro Matri, Antonio Nocerino, Valter Birsa and Robinho were supposed to be sold too, but they were eventually loaned out.

In

Total expenditure:  €16.8 million

Out

Total income:  €32,4 million

Loans out

Winter 2014–15
25 December 2014 had yet to come when Milan announced its first winter transfer: a switch with Atlético Madrid by loaning them Fernando Torres and bringing Alessio Cerci to Italy. In the next few days, all details were settled, including the full acquisition of the Spanish player from Chelsea. Later in this transfer window, Milan also signed Suso, Salvatore Bocchetti, Mattia Destro, Luca Antonelli, and Gabriel Paletta. In April, Pablo Armero returned to Udinese.

In

Out

Loans out

Pre-season and friendlies
Milan returned to training at Milanello from 9 July. The Rossoneri started their season with a series of pre-season friendlies. In the summer, Milan took part in the International Champions Cup, played across the United States and Canada between 24 July and 4 August. It was the club's second presence in the tournament. On 23 August, Milan played against Juventus and Sassuolo in TIM Trophy, eventually winning the competition. On 5 November, Milan won Trofeo Luigi Berlusconi after defeating San Lorenzo, the winners of 2014 Copa Libertadores. Milan also won the 2014 Dubai Challenge Cup on 30 December following a 4–2 win over Real Madrid, the 2013–14 UEFA Champions League champions.

Competitions

Overall

Serie A

League table

Results summary

Results by round

Matches

Coppa Italia

Statistics

Appearances and goals

Last update: 1 June 2015

References

A.C. Milan seasons
Milan